Martin Velkovski (born 10 March 1997) is a Macedonian handball player for RK Eurofarm Pelister and the North Macedonia national team.

He participated at the 2017 Men's Junior World Handball Championship.

References

External links

1997 births
Living people
Macedonian male handball players
Sportspeople from Skopje
Competitors at the 2018 Mediterranean Games
Mediterranean Games competitors for North Macedonia